Major General Sir Harold Goodeve Ruggles-Brise  (17 March 1864 – 24 June 1927) was a British Army officer in the Second Boer War and First World War, and a good amateur cricketer.

Early life
Harold Ruggles-Brise was born in Essex in Spains Hall, Finchingfield on 17 March 1864, the fifth son of Sir Samuel Brise Ruggles-Brise, of Spains Hall, Essex, and his wife Marianne Weyland Bowyer-Smith, daughter of Sir Edward Bowyer-Smith, 10th Baronet, of Hill Hall, Essex. His eldest brothers were Archie (who inherited Spains Hall) and Evelyn (later Sir Evelyn Ruggles-Brise, chairman of the Prison Commission). Unlike his elder brothers who went to Eton College, Harold was educated at Winchester College, where he was in the Rev J. T. Bramston's House, and at Balliol College, Oxford. At Oxford, Ruggles-Brise obtained a Second Class in Classical Moderations and his cricket Blue in 1883.

Military career
After Oxford, Ruggles-Brise entered the Royal Military College, Sandhurst, passing out in 1885, and was commissioned as a lieutenant in the Grenadier Guards. He served with the 2nd Battalion, Grenadier Guards, as battalion adjutant of the 3rd Battalion 1893–94, and as adjutant of the Guards Depot at Caterham 1895. He then studied at the Staff College, Camberley from 1896–97.

Boer War
Promoted to captain in 1897, Ruggles-Brise served with the 2nd Battalion, Grenadier Guards at Gibraltar before being appointed brigade major to the infantry brigade at Gibraltar in March 1899. In October that year he and his brigadier, Major General Sir Henry Colville, were transferred to Cape Colony as part of the troop build-up for the Second Boer War. Colville took command of the 1st (Guards) Brigade in Major-General Lord Methuen's 1st Division, with Ruggles-Brise as his brigade major.

Advancing to relieve Kimberley at the beginning of the war, Methuen attempted a night attack at Belmont on 22/23 November 1899. He sent Colville off with his brigade to assault Gun Hill: although 'They were guided by my Brigade Major, Captain Ruggles-Brise, who led them to the exact spot', Colville admitted that he had miscalculated the distance, and that the commanding officer of 3rd Grenadier Guards attacked the wrong hill. Neither error was Ruggles-Brise's fault and he received his first Mention in Despatches for his work that night. He distinguished himself again at the Battle of Modder River and was present at the Battle of Magersfontein.

When Colville was promoted to command 9th Division, Ruggles-Brise went with him as his Deputy Assistant Adjutant General. However, in May 1900, while Lord Roberts was closing in on Johannesburg, a Yeomanry battalion under Colville's command was cut off and forced to surrender, Colville was made a scapegoat and sent home. Ruggles-Brise remained in South Africa until the end of the year, when he was re-appointed as brigade major in Home District (London).

School of Musketry
Ruggles-Brise was promoted brevet major on 9 November 1900, and became a regimental major by seniority on 11 October 1902. On 1 April 1903 he became brigade major of the Brigade of Guards, and simultaneously of 9th Brigade.

Promoted to lieutenant colonel on 20 July 1907, Ruggles-Brise became commanding officer of the 3rd Battalion, Grenadier Guards for four years. After completing this term, and having been promoted to colonel on 30 August 1911, he was next appointed commandant of the School of Musketry at Hythe. In 1909 the School of Musketry had advocated that each British infantry battalion should be equipped with six instead of two machine-guns. This had been turned down on grounds of cost, so the decision had been made to train the infantry in rapid-fire musketry to make up for the lack of automatic weapons. During Ruggles-Brises's command the school played a crucial role in training the instructors who in turn taught the British Regular Army to shoot so effectively that in the early part of the First World War German reports repeatedly credited them with possessing large numbers of machine-guns. Conversely, Ruggles-Brise has been criticised for delaying the development of anti-aircraft machine-guns in 1912.

First World War

20th Brigade at Ypres
Soon after the outbreak of the First World War, Ruggles-Brise was promoted temporary brigadier general (15 September) to command a brigade composed of the last three Regular infantry battalions left in Britain after the British Expeditionary Force (BEF) went to France. They constituted the 20th Brigade of the 7th Division and assembled at Lyndhurst, Hampshire. Although not officially designated a Guards brigade, it did contain two Guards battalions (1st Grenadiers and 2nd Scots Guards), together with 2nd Border Regiment; it was joined by 2nd Gordon Highlanders, which returned from Cairo just before the brigade sailed from Southampton.

Seventh Division landed at Zeebrugge on 7 October 1914, intended to assist the Belgian Army in the defence of Antwerp. In the event all it could do was help to cover the Belgian retreat and then take up defensive positions at Ypres where they were joined by the rest of the BEF after the Race to the Sea. Thereafter 20th Brigade was engaged in heavy fighting at Langemarck and Gheluvelt during the First Battle of Ypres Like several other senior officers who got out among their units to exercise personal command during this confused fighting, Ruggles-Brise was wounded, being carried back 'half dead of a dreadful wound on a stretcher' on 2 November. During his convalescence he reverted to the half-pay list, but after returning to active duty in July 1915 he was appointed brigadier-general, general staff, at the Aldershot Training Centre.

The Bantams
On 25 September 1915, Ruggles-Brise was promoted to temporary major general and appointed to command the 40th Division. This was a new formation, one of the last of Kitchener's 'New Army' divisions, and by the time it was organised the flow of volunteers had slackened and the army had to reduce its height requirement for infantry in an effort to attract recruits. This led to the creation of so-called 'Bantam' battalions of smaller men. 40th Division's 119th Brigade was the Welsh Bantam Brigade composed of 'well-knit, hardy Welshmen', but 'the men of the other two brigades (120th and 121st) contained a large proportion of under-developed and unfit men, and a drastic weeding-out became necessary'. 'It was estimated that only two serviceable battalions could be formed from the existing four in each brigade, consequently the 120th and 121st Brigades would each require two new battalions to complete it to war establishment. Early in 1916 Ruggles-Brise recommended that four new battalions should be sent, to prevent the departure of the division overseas being indefinitely postponed. The four battalions of 118th Brigade (39th Division) were transferred to complete his brigades. The reorganisation was completed in February 1916 and the division was fully mobilised by the end of May.

The 40th Division under Ruggles-Brise embarked for France in early June and took its place on the Western Front to join in the continuous trench warfare. One of his brigades assisted another division in the Battle of the Ancre (the last phase of the Battle of the Somme) in November 1916, and the division followed up the German retreat to the Hindenburg Line in March 1917, but the whole division's first offensive actions came in April and May 1917. On 21, 24 and 25 April, the 40th Division captured 'Fifteen Ravine' (a valley originally bordered by 15 distinctive trees), Villers-Plouich and Beaucamp. Today, Fifteen Ravine British Cemetery stands in Farm Ravine, which was captured by the 12th (Service) Battalion, South Wales Borderers, while Villers-Plouich was captured by the 13th (Service) Battalion East Surrey Regiment.

Home defence
Ruggles-Brise was promoted to substantive major-general for "distinguished service in the field" on 3 June 1917. He relinquished command of the 40th Division on 24 August 1917 and returned to England to take over command of the 73rd Division, a Home Defence formation stationed in Essex. Originally composed of men of the Territorial Force who had not volunteered for (or were unfit for) overseas service, this distinction had been swept away by the Military Service Act 1916, and the division's role had changed to fitness training to prepare these former home service men for drafting to fighting divisions. Towards the end of 1917 the War Office decided to disband the home service divisions, and the 73rd Division was progressively broken up between January and March 1918. Ruggles-Brise relinquished his command on 4 March 1918.

Haig's right-hand man
His next posting was as Military Secretary at General Headquarters (GHQ) of the British Expeditionary Force under the Commander-in-Chief (C-in-C), Field Marshal Sir Douglas Haig. After harsh criticism of GHQ's performance during the 1917 fighting, several of Haig's senior staff had been replaced by new men like Ruggles-Brise brought in. The Military Secretary was one of the C-in-C's closest assistants with particular responsibility for promotions and appointments. Ruggles-Brise arrived in the middle of the German spring offensive of March 1918, and one of his first jobs was to inform the commander of the British Fifth Army, Lieutenant General Sir Hubert Gough – in the midst of organising a counter-attack – that he was being replaced. Gough recalled that Ruggles-Brise 'told me as nicely as he could'.

Retirement
Ruggles-Brise continued as Haig's Military Secretary throughout the German Offensives and then the Allies' victorious Hundred Days Offensive of 1918. He finally relinquished the position on 13 April 1919. He then worked in the Military Secretary's Department in England until 3 September 1919, and retired from the army on 10 March 1920. In retirement he devoted himself to soldiers' welfare, and was secretary of the Officers' Association.

Honours and awards
Ruggles-Brise had been mentioned in despatches five times during the Boer War. As Commanding Officer of 3rd Grenadier Guards, he was made a Member of the Royal Victorian Order (MVO) – a personal award by the King. After his active service in 1914 he was made a Companion of the Order of the Bath (CB). During the First World War he was mentioned in despatches five more times, and afterwards was made a Knight Commander of the Order of St Michael and St George (KCMG) in the King's Birthday Honours of June 1919 (thereby becoming Sir Harold Ruggles-Brise). In addition, he was made a Commander of the Belgian Order of Leopold, a Commander of the French Legion of Honour, and awarded the French Croix de Guerre.

Cricket career
Ruggles-Brise was an all-round sportsman, considered an excellent shot and a good tennis player. He was best known for his cricketing prowess as a right-hand batsman and medium-pace bowler. He was in the Winchester XI 1880–82 and played for Oxford University Cricket Club in 1883, winning his Blue. The following year he played for the Marylebone Cricket Club (MCC). His first-class career for Oxford and MCC consisted of eight matches, in which he scored 278 runs at an average of 18.53 with a highest score of 73. He took one wicket. He also played twice for Essex in non-first-class matches. As a serving officer he played regularly for the Household Brigade team.

Family
In 1895 Ruggles-Brise married music expert Lady Dorothea Stewart Murray  (1866–1937), elder daughter of the 7th Duke of Atholl. They had no children. Ruggles-Brise died at the age of 63 on 24 June 1927 of pneumonia contracted after playing tennis a few days before.

Notes

References
 Maj A.F. Becke,History of the Great War: Order of Battle of Divisions, Part 1: The Regular British Divisions, London: HM Stationery Office, 1934/Uckfield: Naval & Military Press, 2007, .
 Maj A.F. Becke,History of the Great War: Order of Battle of Divisions, Part 2b: The 2nd-Line Territorial Force Divisions (57th–69th), with the Home-Service Divisions (71st–73rd) and 74th and 75th Divisions, London: HM Stationery Office, 1937/Uckfield: Naval & Military Press, 2007, .
 Maj A.F. Becke,History of the Great War: Order of Battle of Divisions, Part 3a: New Army Divisions (30–41) and 63rd (R.N.) Division, London: HM Stationery Office, 1939/Uckfield: Naval & Military Press, 2007, .
 Maj A.F. Becke,History of the Great War: Order of Battle of Divisions, Part 4: The Army Council, GHQs, Armies, and Corps 1914–1918, London: HM Stationery Office, 1944/Uckfield: Naval & Military Press, 2007, .
 Burke's Landed Gentry, 15th Edn, London, 1937.
 Louis Creswicke, South Africa and the Transvaal War, Vol II: From the Commencement of the War to the Battle of Colenso, 15 Dec 1899, Edinburgh, 1900 
 Brig-Gen J.E. Edmonds, History of the Great War: Military Operations, France and Belgium, 1914, Vol II, London: Macmillan, 1925/Imperial War Museum & Battery Press, 1995, .
 A.H. Farrar-Hockley, Ypres 1914: Death of an Army, London: Arthur Barker 1967/Pan 1970.
 Anthony Farrar-Hockley, Goughie: The Life of General Sir Hubert Gough, London: Hart-Davis, MacGibbon, 1975, .
 Hart's Army List, various dates.
 Rayne Kruger, Goodbye Dolly Gray: The Story of the Boer War, London: Cassell, 1959/Pan 1974, .
 Peter Liddle (ed.), Passchendaele in Perspective: The Third Battle of Ypres, London: Leo Cooper, 1997, .
 Stephen M. Miller, Lord Methuen and the British Army: Failure and Redemption in South Africa, London: Frank Cass, 1999.
 Monthly Army List, various dates.
 Quarterly Army List, various dates.
 Tim Travers, The Killing Ground: The British Army, the Western Front, and the Emergence of Modern Warfare 1900–1918, London: Routledge, 1990, .
 Who Was Who, 1916–1928.
 Leon Wolff, In Flanders Fields: The 1917 Campaign, London: Longmans, 1958/Corgi 1966.

External sources
 Anglo-Boer War.com
 Cricket Archive
 Commonwealth War Graves Commission
 London Gazette
 The Long, Long Trail

|-

1864 births
1927 deaths
People from Finchingfield
Military personnel from Essex
British Army major generals
People educated at Winchester College
English cricketers
Oxford University cricketers
Marylebone Cricket Club cricketers
Alumni of Balliol College, Oxford
Graduates of the Royal Military College, Sandhurst
Grenadier Guards officers
British Army personnel of the Second Boer War
British Army generals of World War I
Graduates of the Staff College, Camberley

Companions of the Order of the Bath
Knights Commander of the Order of St Michael and St George
Members of the Royal Victorian Order

Recipients of the Croix de Guerre 1914–1918 (France)
Recipients of the Legion of Honour